Mark Douglas Britnell (born 5 January 1966) is a senior partner at the professional services firm KPMG and a global healthcare expert. He was the chairman and senior partner for healthcare, government and infrastructure at KPMG International until September 2020.

He was previously a director-general at the Department of Health and a member of the management board of the National Health Service (NHS) in England (July 2007–September 2009), as well as chief executive of University Hospitals Birmingham NHS Foundation Trust and the South Central Strategic Health Authority, but on three successive occasions was unsuccessful in his attempts to become NHS England chief executive.

Career
Having studied history at the University of Warwick, he joined the fast-track NHS Management Training Scheme in 1989, receiving his post-graduate education at Warwick Business School at the University of Warwick.

His early career included various management posts in the NHS, a spell with the Australian health service, a year in the civil service fast stream during which he was sponsored by the Australian College of Health Service Executives to work in Melbourne and Sydney before being seconded to the NHS Executive in 1992. Britnell joined St Mary's Hospital in London as a General Manager before being appointed as a Director at Central Middlesex Hospital (now part of North West London Hospitals NHS Trust) in 1995, when he was named Project Director for an Ambulatory Care and Diagnostic (ACAD) Private Finance Initiative (PFI) scheme - the first of its kind in the UK. He became chief executive at University Hospitals Birmingham NHS Foundation Trust. having been chief operating officer there, and led the organization from 1998 to 2006. It became an NHS Foundation Trust in the so-called 'first wave', and a PFI hospital rebuild, including a Royal Centre for Defence Medicine in partnership with the Ministry of Defence. In 2006 he was appointed as chief executive of the NHS South Central strategic health authority (covering the area from Oxford to the Isle of Wight). He was Director-General for Commissioning and System Management for the National Health Service (NHS) of England (July 2007-September 2009). During this time he oversaw the development of the World Class Commissioning policy, the creation of the Cooperation and Competition Panel and reforms to primary care, patient and public engagement, integrated care and community services.

In 2009 he joined KPMG as head of health for the UK and Europe, becoming global chairman for health in 2010 and global chairman and senior partner for healthcare, government and infrastructure in 2018. He reports that in these roles he has travelled to 80 countries He finished this role in 2020, and is currently a UK health partner for KPMG. 

He was said to have expressed an interest in the post of NHS chief executive in 2006 (when David Nicholson was appointed) and to have applied again in 2013 (when Simon Stevens was instead the successful appointee). He also formally applied in 2021, when he (and Dido Harding) were both again unsuccessful, being beaten in the open competition for the role by Amanda Pritchard.

Books
In October 2015 Britnell published 'In Search of the Perfect Health System', an analysis of 25 national health systems around the world and seven key trends facing healthcare globally. It won the health and social care category in the British Medical Association's Medical Book Awards 2016 and Best Health Book in China in 2017 from the Chinese Medical Doctors Association. The book is published in Mandarin, Portuguese and Korean, and sold in 109 countries. In March 2019 he published 'Human: solving the global workforce crisis in healthcare'. It is a response to the warning from the World Health Organization that by 2030 there will be a global shortage of around 18 million healthcare workers – about a fifth of the required workforce. Royalties of his books are said to go to the charity Prostate Cancer UK.

Other activities
Via KPMG he was a member of the World Economic Forum Global Agenda Council on the Future of the Health Sector for four years. He is a Trustee of the King's Fund. He has honorary degrees from Birmingham City University and University of Wolverhampton, and an honorary professorship at Taishan Medical University School in China. He also sits on the advisory board of the China Center for Health Development at Peking University. He was a Trustee of the cancer charity Prostate Cancer UK, having been diagnosed and treated for the disease in 2008. He has often praised the NHS for saving his life.

NHS competition and privatisation controversy
In 2010, while discussing British health reforms at a private healthcare industry conference in the US, Britnell said: "In future, The NHS will be a state insurance provider not a state deliverer", and that "The NHS will be shown no mercy and the best time to take advantage of this will be in the next couple of years." In the light of the subsequent controversy, KPMG issued a press statement on his behalf on 16 May 2011 which did not deny the accuracy of the quotations, but asserted that "The article in The Observer [15 May] attributes quotes to me that do not properly reflect discussions held at a private conference last October. Nor was I given the opportunity to respond ahead of publication." The Health Service Journal website published a longer statement from Britnell on 17 May.  Commenting on the UK health service in an article for the Guardian Health Network, Britnell said "I'm proud to have worked for the NHS, with its great people, and now feel privileged to be able to work on health systems internationally."

Publications
 In Search of the Perfect Health System, Palgrave 2015 
 Human: Solving the global workforce crisis in healthcare, Oxford University Press 2019

References

External links
Profile: Dr Mark Britnell, Global Head of Health, KPMG 
Mark Britnell at the Department of Health, 11 March 2008 (archived)
Column archive at NHS/CPC Creative
Mark Britnell collected news and commentary at Health Service Journal

1966 births
Living people
Administrators in the National Health Service
Alumni of the University of Warwick
British civil servants
English healthcare chief executives
KPMG people
Place of birth missing (living people)